Tagarkhay (Taharkhai) is a rural locality (a selo) in Tunkinsky District, Republic of Buryatia, Russia. The population was 382 as of 2010. There are 5 streets.

Geography 
Tagarkhay is located 61 km northeast of Kyren (the district's administrative centre) by road. Arshan is the nearest rural locality.

References 

Rural localities in Tunkinsky District